Hammersley Inlet, in southwestern Puget Sound in the U.S. state of Washington, is an arm of water leading to Shelton, Washington and Oakland Bay. Hammersley Inlet is also known as Big Skookum.

Description
Hammersley Inlet connects the Oakland Bay and Shelton to the greater Puget Sound. As tides change in the South Puget Sound, Hammersley Inlet is the only artery through which all water must flow between the Oakland Bay and the greater Puget Sound. Many mariners avoid Hammersley because of these conditions, but with the proper planning, a depth sounder, and care, Hammersley can be navigated without incident. The NOAA chart for the inlet is #18457, but most locals rely on the placemats from the Shelton Yacht Club. 

There are few aids to navigation on Hammersley, as the many log booms towed through the inlet over the years have destroyed them. Mariners are advised to study their charts, create a route, and stick to it. Hammersley Inlet ends as it meets the Oakland Bay, in the city of Shelton. Hammersley Inlet is also known for its abundant shellfish production of clams and oysters.

Hammersley Inlet was named by Charles Wilkes during the Wilkes Expedition of 1838–1842, to honor George W. Hammersley, one of the expedition's midshipmen.

References

Inlets of Washington (state)
Landforms of Puget Sound
Bodies of water of Mason County, Washington